Ivan Vasilev Ivanov (31 March 1942 – 28 May 2006) was a Bulgarian football goalkeeper who played for Bulgaria in the 1962 FIFA World Cup. He also played for Cherno More Varna.

References

External links
Player Profile at chernomorefc.com
FIFA profile

1942 births
2006 deaths
Bulgarian footballers
Bulgaria international footballers
First Professional Football League (Bulgaria) players
PFC Minyor Pernik players
PFC Cherno More Varna players
1962 FIFA World Cup players
Association football goalkeepers
People from Pernik